The 27th Golden Bell Awards was held on 11 July 1992 at the Sun Yat-sen Memorial Hall in Taipei, Taiwan. The ceremony was broadcast by Chinese Television System (CTS).

Winners

References

1992
1992 in Taiwan